Ingberry is a former rural locality in the Barcaldine Region, Queensland, Australia.

On 22 November 2019 the Queensland Government decided to amalgamate the localities in the Barcaldine Region, resulting in five expanded localities based on the larger towns: Alpha, Aramac, Barcaldine, Jericho and Muttaburra. The larger southern part of Ingberry was incorporated into Barcaldine, while the smaller northern part was incorporated into Aramac.

Geography 
The Barcaldine Aramac Road passes through the locality entering from the south (Barcaldine) and exiting to the west (Ibis).

Aramac Creek rises in the south-east of the locality and flows through the locality, exiting to the north (Pelican Creek). It is a tributary of the Thomson River which is part of the Lake Eyre drainage basin.

The principal land use is grazing.

Education 
There are no schools in Ingberry. The nearest primary schools are in neighbouring Aramac and Barcaldine. The nearest secondary schools are also in Aramac (to Year 10 only) and Barcaldine (to Year 12).

References 

Barcaldine Region
Unbounded localities in Queensland